Sharavegada Saradara is a 1989 Indian Kannada-language action film starring Kumar Bangarappa, Ashwini Bhave and Poonam Javeri. The film has musical score by Sangeetha Raja. The film is based on a novel by Sudarshan Desai. Director K. V. Jayaram, who also wrote the screenplay, shot the film in 70mm format making it the first 70mm film in Kannada.

Plot 
Vishwanath Rai is a wealthy, kind-hearted businessman who has earned much respect by his deeds. Naganna, his brother-in-law, plots against him so as to execute some of his wicked schemes and make it big in the field of black money. When the former discovers this he fights Naganna and dies in the process. Thirsty for vengeance, his son Tejashri "Teja" returns from abroad after several years to confront his nemesis.

Cast 
 Kumar Bangarappa
 Ashwini Bhave
 Poonam Javeri
 Asha Parekh
 Pandaribai
 C. R. Simha
 H. G. Dattatreya
 Master Manjunath
 Honnavalli Krishna

Soundtrack
The film has musical score by Sangeetha Raja. The soundtrack album comprises seven tracks with five singles and two duets. S. P. Balasubrahmanyam rendered his voice for all the songs. The lyrics were penned by Doddarange Gowda.

Track listing 
 "Kote Katti Meredaa" by S. P. Balasubrahmanyam
 "Anuraagave Hoovagide" by S. P. Balasubrahmanyam and K. S. Chithra
 "Atta Itta Sutta Mutta" by S. P. Balasubrahmanyam and K. S. Chithra
 "Aaseyo Kaadide" by Anuradha
 "Yuga Yugada Belakagi" by S. P. Balasubrahmanyam
 "Kannada Naadina Rannada" by S. P. Balasubrahmanyam
 "Sharavegada Saradara theme song" by S. P. Balasubrahmanyam

See also 
 Aruna Raaga
 Ibbani Karagithu
 Ksheera Sagara

References

External links 
 
 Sharavegada Saradara at Gaana
 Sharavegada Saradara at iTunes

1989 films
Indian films about revenge
Films based on Indian novels
1980s Kannada-language films